Lotofoa is a settlement in Foa island, Tonga. It had a population of 413 in 2016.

References

Populated places in Tonga
Haʻapai